Hector James Hurst (born 15 July 1992) is an ex-professional racing driver who is now a businessman. He competed in many championships including FIA Formula Two and the FIA Formula Three European Championship.

Racing Record

Career summary

Complete FIA Formula Two Championship results
(key) (Races in bold indicate pole position) (Races in italics indicate fastest lap)

References

External links
 

1992 births
Living people
People from Lymington
British Formula Renault 2.0 drivers
Formula BMW Europe drivers
FIA Formula Two Championship drivers
Euroformula Open Championship drivers
FIA Formula 3 European Championship drivers
MRF Challenge Formula 2000 Championship drivers
Formula Renault BARC drivers
Manor Motorsport drivers
Team West-Tec drivers
De Villota Motorsport drivers